Eric Nshimiyimana (born 8 May 1972) is a Rwandan football coach and former player. He currently coaches Rwanda National Football League side A.S. Kigali.

Career

Playing career
Born in Bujumbura in Burundi, Nshimiyimana played as a midfielder for Prince Louis, APR and Kiyovu Sports.

He played for the Rwandan national team between 1996 and 2004, appearing in four FIFA World Cup qualifying matches for them. He was a squad member at the 2004 African Cup of Nations.

Coaching career
Nshimiyimana managed A.S. Kigali in 2008.

Nshimiyimana became an assistant coach for the Rwandan national team in April 2008, working Raoul Shungu to assist manager Branko Tucak. When Tucak was sacked in November 2009, Nshimiyimana became interim manager of the national team. He was re-appointed manager in 2013; in April 2014 the Rwandan Football Association announced an 8-man shortlist to replace him after his contract expired on 30 June.

In June 2014 he was linked with the role of Kiyovu Sports manager, and he was appointed to the job in July 2014 ahead of the 2014–15 season.

He moved to coach A.S. Kigali later that month, being sacked by the club in October 2018. He returned to the club for a third time in July 2019. In December 2019 he was said to be close to being sacked, but in July 2020 he was offered a new contract by the club.

References

1972 births
Living people
Sportspeople from Bujumbura
Rwandan footballers
Rwanda international footballers
Prince Louis FC players
APR F.C. players
S.C. Kiyovu Sports players
Association football midfielders
Rwandan football managers
Rwanda national football team managers
2004 African Cup of Nations players